Athelstane Township is a township in Clay County, Kansas, USA.  As of the 2000 census, its population was 144. It was named after Athelstaneford, Scotland when Robert Hamilton, an early settler, selected the name for the post office.

Geography
According to the USGS, it contains one cemetery, Athelstane.

The streams of Badger Creek, Basket Creek, and McMurray Creek run through this township.

References

External links
 City-Data.com

Townships in Clay County, Kansas
Townships in Kansas